Brunette Francisco Hay Pino (born 7 September 1984) is a football striker who currently plays for Platense in the Honduran Liga Nacional.

Club career
A tall striker, Hay represented a few different local teams and had a stint in Uruguayan football with Racing Club de Montevideo. He moved to Colombia to play alongside compatriot Clive Trotman at Academia in January 2006 and he later signed for San Francisco from Tauro in April 2009. In July 2009, Hay joined Colombian club Independiente Medellín on loan and in July 2010 he moved to Cortuluá for another 6-month loan alongside compatriot Alejandro Vélez. He returned to Sporting SM in December 2010. In August 2011 he went for a trial to and in September 2011 he made his debut in the Swedish league with Örebro.

Costa Rica
In summer 2012, he moved abroad again to play for Costa Rican club Pérez Zeledón but he left them for Bolivian side Nacional Potosí after scoring 8 goals in 22 games. He returned to Pérez Zeledón in summer 2013, alongside fellow Panamanian Armando Polo. In May 2014, he moved on to Costa Rican giants Herediano, where he was joined by compatriot Gabriel Enrique Gómez. Herediano sent him on loan to Belén in January 2015.

After he was released, Hay was expected to sign with Guatemalan side Universidad SC, but the move did not materialize.

References

External links
 
 - ADN

1984 births
Living people
Sportspeople from Panama City
Association football forwards
Panamanian footballers
Sporting San Miguelito players
C.D. Árabe Unido players
Racing Club de Montevideo players
Academia F.C. players
Tauro F.C. players
San Francisco F.C. players
Independiente Medellín footballers
Cortuluá footballers
Örebro SK players
Municipal Pérez Zeledón footballers
Nacional Potosí players
C.S. Herediano footballers
Belén F.C. players
Platense F.C. players
Liga FPD players
Liga Nacional de Fútbol Profesional de Honduras players
Categoría Primera A players
Allsvenskan players
Panamanian expatriate footballers
Expatriate footballers in Uruguay
Expatriate footballers in Colombia
Expatriate footballers in Sweden
Expatriate footballers in Bolivia
Expatriate footballers in Costa Rica
Expatriate footballers in Honduras